Mike Harrison (30 September 1942 in Carlisle, Cumberland, England – 25 March 2018, Carlisle) was an English musician, most notable as a principal lead singer of Spooky Tooth and as a solo artist.  He was also the lead singer in The V.I.P.'s, Art and the Hamburg Blues Band, among others.

History
Mike Harrison began his musical career with the Ramrods a band originating from Carlisle that was then Cumberland, the northern part of the now English county of Cumbria. This was to develop the foundations of a career that led to him being notable as the lead singer of Spooky Tooth, a band that he initially co-founded, with Mike Kellie, Luther Grosvenor and Greg Ridley and which Gary Wright then joined.  Harrison, Grosvenor, Ridley and Kellie had previously been in a Carlisle-based band called The V.I.P.'s, which also included Keith Emerson.  When Emerson left in early 1967 to co-found The Nice, the remaining band members changed the band's name to Art and released one album in late 1967 on Island Records.  Label owner Chris Blackwell took an interest in the band, encouraging them to work with Gary Wright and arranging for Jimmy Miller to be the band's producer.  With the addition of Wright, the band became known as Spooky Tooth, releasing four albums between 1968 and 1970, before breaking up for the first time, and three more albums during their reformation and final breakup in the 1972-1974 period.  The band's sound was considered to be particularly unique in that it involved two keyboard players, Harrison and Wright, whose singing style often involved alternating vocals, similar to the Righteous Brothers or Hall and Oates.

Spooky Tooth first broke up in 1970, reformed in 1972 and broke up for a second time in 1974. Harrison commenced a solo career in 1971, which was anticipated with The Last Puff, the band's 1970 breakup album, billed as "Spooky Tooth, featuring Mike Harrison". Harrison released two solo albums in 1971 and 1972, followed by a third in 1975, subsequent to the band's final breakup in 1974.  

Harrison then discovered that the royalties from his solo albums were being applied, without his knowledge or consent, to debts allegedly owed by Spooky Tooth to Island Records.  Following the 1975 release of his album Rainbow Rider, Harrison decided to leave the music industry entirely, and remained largely inactive from 1975 until 1997. The reason for his extended departure from music was primarily financial.  Beyond a weekly stipend from Island Records, band members received no further benefits, including royalties.  Instead, debts were accumulated, considered to be owed to the record company.  Among other occupations, Harrison worked as a barman and drove meat and milk delivery trucks.

Harrison developed a renewed interest in music as of the 1990s, resulting in the recording of three songs with original members Mike Kellie, Luther Grosvenor and Greg Ridley in 1997. Recording continued in 1998, resulting in the release of Cross Purpose in 1999, the first Spooky Tooth album in twenty-five years, following the 1974 release of The Mirror, in which Harrison had not participated.  He had left the band in 1973, following the release of Witness.  Cross Purpose was also the first Spooky Tooth album to feature four of the five original members since Spooky Two, released in 1969.

In 1999, Harrison was also offered a regular monthly engagement with the Hamburg Blues Band.  This led to the release of Touch in 2001.  The album featured lyrics by Pete Brown, longtime collaborator with Jack Bruce, with music by the Hamburg Blues Band and vocals by Harrison.

Harrison's return to music during the 1997-1999 period was followed by a 2004 reunion and tour with original Spooky Tooth members Gary Wright and Mike Kellie, which resulted in the release of the concert DVD Nomad Poets in 2007.  In 2006, Harrison's fourth solo album, Late Starter, was released.

Harrison, Wright and Kellie continued to perform as Spooky Tooth during 2008, after which Kellie departed.  Harrison and Wright continued as Spooky Tooth during 2009. Harrison continued to perform on occasion after that time but died on 25 March 2018 in Carlisle at age 75 of undisclosed causes.

Discography
Solo
1971 Mike Harrison (Island)
1972 Smokestack Lightning (Island)
1975 Rainbow Rider (Island)
2006 Late Starter (Halo)

With The V.I.P.'s

With Art
1967 Supernatural Fairy Tales
With Spooky Tooth
1968 It's All About
1969 Spooky Two
1970 Ceremony (with Pierre Henry)
1970 The Last Puff
1973 You Broke My Heart So I Busted Your Jaw
1973 Witness
1999 Cross Purpose
1999 The Best of Spooky Tooth: That Was Only Yesterday
2001 BBC Sessions
2007 Nomad Poets (DVD)

With the Hamburg Blues Band
2001 Touch - billed as "Mike Harrison meets The Hamburg Blues Band"

References

External links

 The Ramrods

 Spooky Tooth Official Website

1942 births
2018 deaths
English rock singers
Psychedelic rock musicians
Progressive rock musicians
English male singers
Island Records artists
People from Carlisle, Cumbria
Spooky Tooth members